Taipei City Constituency VIII includes all of Wenshan and part of Zhongzheng in southern Taipei. The district was created in 2008, when all local constituencies of the Legislative Yuan were reorganized to become single-member districts.

Current district
 Wenshan
 Zhongzheng: 2 sub-districts
 Gutting: 6 urban villages
 Hedi, Dingdong, Yingxue, Banxi, Wangxi, Yingpu
 Gongguan: 4 urban villages
 Shuiyuan, Linxing, Wensheng, Fushui

Legislators

Election results

References 

Constituencies in Taipei